AIRPARIF is an organisation responsible for monitoring air quality in the Paris agglomeration. Founded in 1979, AIRPARIF is approved by the Ministry of Environment for the monitoring of air quality throughout the Ile-de-France, Paris, France.

Mission

According to the 30 December 1996 Law on Air, AIRPARIF is a non-profit organisation accredited by the Ministry of Environment to monitor the air quality in Île-de-France. Its missions meet a regulatory requirement and come in four functions:
 to monitor air quality
 to forecast pollution episodes
 to assess the impact of emission reduction measures
 to inform the authorities and citizens (daily during an occurrence)

AIRPARIF continuously monitors air quality and contributes towards the assessment of health risks and environmental impacts.

External links
 Official website (in French)
Mission (in French)
Daily results (in French)
Real-time maps (in French)
Publications (in French)

Organizations based in Paris
Environmental organizations based in France